Giles Ian Henderson, CBE (born 20 April 1942) is a solicitor who was Master of Pembroke College, Oxford.

Early life and education
Giles Henderson was educated at Michaelhouse, a boarding independent school in Balgowan in Natal in South Africa, followed by the University of the Witwatersrand, from which he graduated with a Bachelor of Arts degree, and then Magdalen College at the University of Oxford, where he was a Senior Mackinnon Scholar and graduated as Master of Arts and Bachelor of Civil Law.  He received a Fulbright Award and spent a year teaching at the Faculty of Law at University of California, Berkeley in 1966-67.

Career
Henderson joined the leading London law firm of Slaughter and May in 1968 and was admitted as a solicitor in 1970. He became a partner in 1975 and was elected as the Senior Partner for two successive terms of office: 1993-2001. He was one of HM Government's main advisers on the process of privatisation (1983-1991).  He was also a member of the Hampel Committee on Corporate Governance. He was appointed a Commander of the Most Excellent Order of the British Empire (CBE) by HM The Queen in 1992.

In 2001 he became Master of Pembroke College, Oxford, holding the office until 2013. Between 2007 and 2009 he also held the elected office of Chair of the Conference of Colleges in Oxford and was for six years a member of the Council of the University. He was also Chairman of the Nuffield Medical Trust.

Among his other previous appointments, Henderson was Chairman of the UK-China Forum law group, a non-executive director of Land Securities plc and Standard Life Assurance and a member of the Financial Reporting Council.

In 2019 he was elected as the Chairman of the Council at Marlborough College.

References

External links
Jeremy Sutton's portrait of Giles Henderson
Debrett's People of Today (12th edn, London: Debrett's Peerage, 1999), p. 895

Living people
Alumni of Magdalen College, Oxford
UC Berkeley School of Law faculty
Masters of Pembroke College, Oxford
Commanders of the Order of the British Empire
1942 births
English solicitors
Alumni of Michaelhouse
University of the Witwatersrand alumni